Ekaterina Yevgenyevna Shumilova (born 25 October 1986 in Solikamsk) is a Russian biathlete. She competed at the Biathlon World Championships 2013 in Nové Město na Moravě, where she placed fourth in the relay with the Russian team. She competed at the 2014 Winter Olympics in Sochi, in sprint and pursuit.

References

1986 births
Living people
People from Solikamsk
Sportspeople from Perm Krai
Russian female biathletes
Biathletes at the 2014 Winter Olympics
Olympic biathletes of Russia
Competitors stripped of Winter Olympics medals